Robert Longo (born 1953) is an American artist, filmmaker, photographer and musician.

Longo became first well known in the 1980s for his Men in the Cities drawing and print series, which depict sharply dressed men and women writhing in contorted emotion. He lives in New York and East Hampton.

Early life and education
Longo was born in 1953 in Brooklyn, New York, and raised in Long Island. He had a childhood fascination with mass media: movies, television, magazines, and comic books, which continue to influence his art.

Longo began college at the University of North Texas, in the town of Denton, but left before getting a degree. He later studied sculpture under Leonda Finke, who encouraged him to pursue a career in the visual arts. In 1972, Longo received a grant to study at the Accademia di Belle Arti in Florence, Italy. Upon his return to New York, Longo enrolled at Buffalo State College, where he received a BFA in 1975. While at Buffalo State, he studied under, and was likely influenced by art professor Joseph Piccillo. At this time he was associated with artist Cindy Sherman, who was also studying art at Buffalo State.

While in college, Longo and his friends established an avant garde art gallery in their co-op building, the Essex Art Center, which was originally a converted ice factory; the gallery became Hallwalls Contemporary Art Center. Through his gallery efforts, Longo met many local and New York City artists and eventually moved to New York City to participate in the art scene of the late-1970s, for example with the artists and critics involved with the journal Effects: Magazine for New Art Theory.

Work

Drawing
Although he studied sculpture, drawing remained Longo's favorite form of self-expression. However, the sculptural influence pervades his drawing technique, as Longo's "portraits" have a distinctive chiseled line that seems to give the drawings a three-dimensional quality. Longo uses graphite like clay, molding it to create images like the writhing, dancing figures in his seminal Men in the Cities series. For that series, Longo photographed his friends lurching backward, collapsing forward or sprawled on invisible pavement. After enlarging the pictures through a projector, he and an artist assistant drew them in sizes ranging from three-quarter scale to larger than life-size. In the process, Longo often dramatized poses and always standardized attire into quite formal, black-and-white clothing. The idea for this work came, in 1975, from a still image in Rainer Werner Fassbinder's film The American Soldier. According to art critic William Wilson of the Los Angeles Times, the pictures recall nothing so much as the final scene in Ingmar Bergman's The Seventh Seal. About four years passed before Longo turned the vision of a man shot in the back into a monumental series of drawings. He produced about 60 Men in the Cities between 1979 and 1982. One drawing from this series was used as the album cover to Glenn Branca's album The Ascension. As a consequence, in his 30s, Longo was among the most widely publicized, exhibited and collected artists of the 1980s along with the likes of Cindy Sherman and David Salle. However, several critics have commented that Longo had lost his way as a visual artist by the mid-'80s.

Working on themes of power and authority, Longo produced a series of blackened American flags ("Black Flags" 1989–91) as well as oversized hand guns (Bodyhammers 1993–95).  From 1995 to 1996 he worked on his Magellan project, 366 drawings (one per day) that formed an archive of the artist's life and surrounding cultural images. "Magellan" was followed by 2002's Freud Drawings, which reinterpreted Edmund Engelman's famous documentary images of Sigmund Freud's flat, moments before his flight from the Nazis. In 2002 and 2004 he presented Monsters, Bernini-esque renderings of massive breaking waves and The Sickness of Reason, baroque renderings of atomic bomb blasts. Monsters was included in the 2004 Whitney Biennial.

To create works such as Barbara and Ralph, Longo projects photographs of his subjects onto paper and traces the figures in graphite, removing all details of the background. After he records the basic contours, his long-time illustrator, Diane Shea, works on the figure for about a week, filling in the details. Next, Longo goes back into the drawing, using graphite and charcoal to provide "all the cosmetic work". Longo continues to work on the drawing, making numerous adjustments until it is completed about a week later.

In March 2013, The Lexander Magazine reviewed Longo's 1982–83 diptych entitled Pressure, highlighting it as the "penultimate visual anthem of the era," expanding upon Neal Benezra's 1988 analysis of the work as having been "the most representative work of art of the 1980s."

Music videos
In the 1980s, Longo directed several music videos, including New Order's Bizarre Love Triangle, Megadeth's Peace Sells and The One I Love by R.E.M. He is responsible for the front covers of Glenn Branca's The Ascension from 1981 and The Replacements' 1985 album Tim.

Film and television
In 1992, Longo directed an episode of Tales from the Crypt entitled "This'll Kill Ya". He also directed the cyberpunk film Johnny Mnemonic, starring Keanu Reeves, Dolph Lundgren and Takeshi Kitano, and a short film named Arena Brains.  At the time, Longo was quoted as saying, "making a painting is one thing, but making a film kicks your ass." During the late 1980s and early 1990s Longo developed a number of performance art theatre pieces, such as Marble Fog and Killing Angels, collaborating with Stuart Argabright, the guitarist Chuck Hammer and Douglas Sloan.

Music
Longo was the leader and guitarist of a musical act called Robert Longo's Menthol Wars, which performed punk experimental music in New York rock clubs in the late 1970s. During the same period, he also performed with Rhys Chatham in Chatham's Guitar Trio, producing a series of slowly fading slides entitled Pictures for Music, which was played behind the musicians.

Photography
Commissioned by Italian luxury label Bottega Veneta, Longo photographed models Terron Wood and Alla K for the brand's fall/winter 2010 advertisements, evoking memories of the dancing silhouettes of his Men in the Cities series.

Exhibitions
Longo has had retrospective exhibitions at Hamburger Kunstverein and Deichtorhallen, Menil Collection in Houston, the Los Angeles County Museum of Art in 1989, the Museum of Contemporary Art, Chicago in 1990, Hartford Athenaeum, The Isetan Museum of Art in Tokyo, and a Survey Exhibition 1980–2009, at Musée d'art moderne et d'art contemporain in Nice France in 2009 and at Museu Colecção Berardo in Lisbon, Portugal in 2010.

Group exhibitions include Documenta VIII, the Whitney Biennial, and the Venice Biennale. His photorealistic charcoal drawings were featured in the exhibition Proof at the Brooklyn Museum in 2017 alongside works by Francisco Goya and Sergei Eisenstein.

Influence
Longo's work from the Men in the Cities series was prominently displayed in the apartment of fictional character Patrick Bateman in the film American Psycho (2000).

In 2013, Longo's artwork was featured in an article in the men's magazine, Man of the World along with an article discussing his life and career.

Art market
Longo is represented by Pace Gallery (since 2021) and Thaddaeus Ropac.

Personal life
Longo lived with artist Cindy Sherman from 1974 to 1980. He lived with artist Gretchen Bender from 1981 to 1989. Longo married German actress Barbara Sukowa in 1994. Together they have 3 sons: Hans Longo, Viktor Longo, and Joseph Longo.

Longo moved to Europe in 1990, living for a few years in Paris and working in Spain and Germany. He lives in New York and East Hampton.

When the COVID-19 pandemic forced the Guild Hall of East Hampton to cancel its 2021 summer gala and auction, Longo volunteered to postpone his own summer exhibition at the space and spearhead a $1 million benefit show in its stead.

Literature
 Heinz-Norbert Jocks: Robert Longo. Das Poetische für mich ist eine höhere Form der Gerechtigkeit, Interview from Heinz-Norbert Jocks'', in: Kunstforum International, Nr. 273, Cologne 2021, p. 192-211.

References

Further reading

External links

20th-century American painters
American male painters
21st-century American painters
21st-century American male artists
Buffalo State College alumni
University of North Texas alumni
20th-century American sculptors
20th-century American male artists
21st-century American sculptors
American male sculptors
American contemporary painters
Postmodern artists
1953 births
Living people
American music video directors
American film directors
20th-century American printmakers
American people of Italian descent
20th-century American photographers
21st-century American photographers